Blunt Force Trauma is a 2015 American-Colombian neo-Western action film written and directed by Ken Sanzel. It stars Ryan Kwanten, Freida Pinto, Carolina Gómez, and Mickey Rourke.

The film premiered in Los Angeles on July 20, 2015, before being released on DVD and Blu-ray on October 6, 2015.

Premise
Pinto plays a woman looking for her brother's killer. The film is based on a banned shooting game, revolving around duelists using kevlar vests. The rules are that one may not aim for lethal shots, and that should one fall out of a predesignated ring which each contestant is stood in, they lose. You may also tap out, similar to other combat sports.

Cast
 Ryan Kwanten as John
 Freida Pinto as Colt
 Carolina Gómez as Marla
 Mickey Rourke as Zorringer
 Christian Tappan as Emmet
 Maruia Shelton as Wesley
 John Alex Castillo as Bernie
 Herbert King as Walton
 Jason Gibson as Huey
 Andrés Suárez as Mendez
 Rubén Zamora as Silva
 Daniel Abril as Rodrigo
 Silvia De Dios as Doctor
 Carmenza Cossio as Roxanne
 Jon Mack as Reggie
 Steven Galarce as Arch
 Victor Gomez as Toby
 Tatiana Ronderos as Sandra

Production
Principal photography was done entirely in Bogotá, Colombia in 2014. In North America, Alchemy is the film's distributor. It competed in the Woodstock Film Festival and the Montreal World Film Festival.

Reception
John DeFore of The Hollywood Reporter criticized the film, stating that it "takes itself much more seriously than viewers will."

References

External links
 

2015 films
2015 action films
2015 direct-to-video films
2015 independent films
American action films
American direct-to-video films
American independent films
Colombian action films
Colombian independent films
Direct-to-video action films
Films shot in Colombia
Neo-Western films
Voltage Pictures films
2010s English-language films
2010s American films